David Moreno may refer to:
 David Moreno (actor), Spanish singer and actor
 David Moreno (footballer), Venezuelan footballer
 Dave Moreno, American drummer with Puddle of Mudd